In molecular biology, YgbB is a protein domain. This entry makes reference to a number of proteins from eukaryotes and prokaryotes which share this common N-terminal signature and appear to be involved in terpenoid biosynthesis. The YgbB protein is a putative enzyme thought to aid terpenoid  and isoprenoid biosynthesis, a vital chemical in all living organisms. This protein domain is part of an enzyme which catalyses a reaction in a complex pathway.

Function
The YgbB protein domain has a main function of being involved in terpenoid and isoprenoid biosynthesis.

Biochemistry
MECDP (2-C-methyl-D-erythritol 2,4-cyclodiphosphate) synthetase, an enzyme in the non-mevalonate pathway of isoprenoid synthesis, isoprenoids being essential in all organisms. Isoprenoids can also be synthesized through the mevalonate pathway. The non-mevolante route is used by many bacteria and human pathogens, including Mycobacterium tuberculosis and Plasmodium falciparum. This route appears to involve seven enzymes. MECDP synthetase catalyses the intramolecular attack by a phosphate group on a diphosphate, with cytidine monophosphate (CMP) acting as the leaving group to give the cyclic diphosphate product MEDCP. The enzyme is a trimer with three active sites shared between adjacent copies of the protein. The enzyme also has two metal binding sites, the metals playing key roles in catalysis.

References 

Protein domains